Shahrak-e Qaleh Juq-e Bozorg (also Romanized as Shahrak-e Qal‘eh Jūq-e Bozorg; also known as Qal‘eh Jūq-e Bozorg) is a village in Gifan Rural District, Garmkhan District, Bojnord County, North Khorasan Province, Iran. At the 2006 census, its population was 1,344, in 288 families.

References 

Populated places in Bojnord County